Karadkhed Dam, is an earthfill dam on local river near Deglur, Nanded district in state of Maharashtra in India.

Specifications
It is situated near Karadkhed which is 12 km away from sub-district headquarter Deglur and 93 km away from district headquarter Nanded.

Purpose
 Irrigation
 Drinking Water Supply to degloor Taluk

See also
 Dams in Maharashtra
 List of reservoirs and dams in India

References

Dams in Nanded district
Dams completed in 1978
1978 establishments in Maharashtra